First post may refer to:

 The First Post, a British daily online news magazine
 Firstpost, an Indian news organization
 First post, an Internet meme written by an internet user to indicate their discovery of an until-then uncommented entry
 A British Army bugle call signalling start of sentry-post inspections, ending in Last Post

See also
 First-past-the-post voting